Gonatodes alexandermendesi is a species of lizard in the family Sphaerodactylidae. The species is indigenous to northern South America.

Etymology
The specific name, alexandermendesi, is in honor of Guyanese businessman Alexander Mendes for his aid to visiting naturalists.

Geographic range
G. alexandermendesi is found in Guyana and Venezuela.

Habitat

Description
It has a very elongate spine on the supraciliary flap above the eye.

Reproduction
G. alexandermendesi is oviparous.

References

Further reading
Cole, Charles J.; Kok, Philippe J. R. (2006). " A New Species of Gekkonid Lizard (Sphaerodactylinae: Gonatodes) from Guyana, South America". American Museum Novitates (3524): 1–13. (Gonatodes alexandermendesi, new species).
Cole, Charles J.; Townsend, Carol R.; Reynolds, Robert P.; MacCulloch, Ross D.; Lathrop, Amy (2013). "Amphibians and reptiles of Guyana, South America: illustrated keys, annotated specie accounts, and a biogeographic synopsis". Proceedings of the Biological society of Washington 125 (4): 317–578 + Plates 580–620.
Schargel, Walter E.; Rivas, Gilson A.; Makowsky, Robert; Señaris, J. Celsa; Natera, Marco A.; Barros, Tito R.; Molina, César A.; Barrio-Amorós, César L. (2010). "Phylogenetic systematics of the genus Gonatodes (Squamata: Sphaerodactylidae) in the Guyana region, with description of a new species from Venezuela". Systematics and Biodiversity 8 (3): 321–339.

Gonatodes
Reptiles of Guyana
Reptiles of Venezuela
Reptiles described in 2006
Taxa named by Charles J. Cole
Taxa named by Philippe J.R. Kok